Gem-associated protein 7 is a protein that in humans is encoded by the GEMIN7 gene. The gem-associated proteins are those found in the gems of Cajal bodies.

Function 
The protein encoded by this gene is a component of the core SMN complex, which is required for pre-mRNA splicing in the nucleus. The encoded protein is found in the nucleoplasm, in nuclear "gems" (Gemini of Cajal bodies), and in the cytoplasm. Three transcript variants encoding the same protein have been found for this gene.

Interactions 
Gem-associated protein 7 has been shown to interact with SMN1 and Gem-associated protein 6.

References

Further reading

External links 
 PDBe-KB provides an overview of all the structure information available in the PDB for Human Gem-associated protein 7